Naryn-Shibir (Narin Sheber) is a rural locality (a selo) in Zaigrayevsky District, Republic of Buryatia, Russia. The population was 126 as of 2010. There are 4 streets.

Geography 
Naryn-Shibir is located 34 km northwest of Sarajevo (the district's administrative centre) by road. Onokhoy is the nearest rural locality.

References 

Rural localities in Zaigrayevsky District